Vasilis Nakis, better known by his stage name Papercut, is a Greek musician and songwriter. He is known for his electronic music and his remix of Melina Merkoyri's song "Agapi pou gines dikopo mahairi". Before launching his solo project, he was a member of the Greek bands Winter Watercolours and Monitor.

History
As he has mentioned in an interview, he came up with his stage name in 2000, after suffering a papercut. "I held on to the name, as a reminder of all those minor things that hurt us a lot", he said in an interview.

Discography
 Papercut  (Universal, 2010)
 Pockets of Silence   (2015)

References

Greek songwriters
Greek musicians
Year of birth missing (living people)
Living people